Olympus is a tension leg platform oil rig, planned as a further development of the Mars field (hence "Mars B").

Design

The body of the platform was fabricated in South Korea, then transported to Texas on the MV Blue Marlin, arriving in January 2013, to be fitted with topside equipment made by Kiewit Offshore Services.

Project
Shell owns 71.5% of the project; BP owns 28.5%. It was originally expected to become operational in 2015 but first oil production safely occurred as quickly as early February 2014. The platform is moored about 130 miles south of New Orleans, and was planned to extract oil from eight Mississippi Canyon blocks: 762, 763, 764, 805, 806, 807, 850 and 851.

Wells are being drilled by the Noble Bully 1. Production is expected to start in 2014.

See also
Offshore oil and gas in the US Gulf of Mexico
Mars (oil platform)

References

Oil platforms off the United States
Petroleum industry in the Gulf of Mexico
Energy infrastructure in Louisiana
Shell plc buildings and structures